Moon and Me is a British-American stop motion children's television series created by Andrew Davenport. The series airs in the UK on CBeebies while it airs in the United States on Universal Kids. The series was helped out by researcher Dylan Yamada-Rice by studying the ways that children interact with toy houses. The series was shot at Trilith Studios, then Pinewood Atlanta Studios, in Fayetteville, Georgia.

Robert Lloyd of Los Angeles Times praised the series, comparing the series' pastoral nature to Thomas & Friends. The series also compared to other programmes, such as Teletubbies, Lunar Jim, In the Night Garden..., and The Roly Mo Show.

The series comprises the following characters: Moon Baby, Pepi Nana, Little Nana, Mr. Onion, Sleepy Dibillo, Lambkin, Colly Wobble and Lily Plant.

References

External links
 
 https://www.bbc.co.uk/cbeebies/shows/moon-and-me

2010s British animated television series
2010s British children's television series
2020s British animated television series
2020s British children's television series
British stop-motion animated television series
Television shows filmed at Pinewood Atlanta Studios